State Route 52 (SR 52) is an  state highway in the southeastern part of the U.S. state of Alabama. The western terminus of the highway is at an intersection with U.S. Route 331 (US 331) at Opp. The eastern terminus of the highway is at the Georgia state line east of Columbia, where the highway crosses over the Chattahoochee River and enter Hilton, Georgia as Georgia State Route 62 (SR 62).

Route description

SR 52 serves as a parallel route of US 84. Beginning at Opp, SR 52 assumes a southeastward trajectory as it heads towards Samson in western Geneva County. At Samson, the highway briefly turns to the east before resuming its southeastward trajectory as it approaches the town of Geneva.

East of Geneva, SR 52 assumes a slight northeastward trajectory. It travels through Hartford, the birthplace of Baseball Hall of Fame member Early Wynn, then continues through Slocomb as it heads towards Dothan, the largest city of Alabama’s Wiregrass Region.

SR 52 has intersections with three U.S. Highways at Dothan. On the city’s west side, the highway meets US 231. On the east side of Dothan, SR 52 intersects US 84 and US 431. All three U.S. Highways are concurrent with SR 210 (Ross Clark Circle), a circumferential bypass of Dothan. As SR 52 heads eastward out of Dothan, it travels through rural areas of Houston County as it heads towards Columbia and the Georgia state line at Hilton, Georgia.

Major intersections

See also

References

External links

052
Transportation in Covington County, Alabama
Transportation in Coffee County, Alabama
Transportation in Geneva County, Alabama
Transportation in Houston County, Alabama